The Lola T89/00 is an open-wheel racing car chassis, designed and built by Lola Cars that competed in the CART open-wheel racing series, for competition in the 1989 IndyCar season. It won a total of 5 races that season; 1 for Bobby Rahal, 2 for Michael Andretti, and 2 for Al Unser Jr., and took 3 pole positions; 2 for Michael Andretti, 1 for Al Unser Jr. It was mainly powered by the Ford-Cosworth DFX, but also used the Buick Indy V6.

References 

Open wheel racing cars
American Championship racing cars
Lola racing cars